Scalideutis ulocoma is a moth in the family Cosmopterigidae. It was described by Edward Meyrick in 1918. It is found in India.

References

Scaeosophinae
Moths described in 1918